Cabildo is an Argentine magazine which is considered the main press organ of nationalist Catholicism in the country. First published in the 1970s and then inactive during most of the 1990s, the magazine has become notorious for its xenophobic and anti-Semitic editorial line.

History
The first issue of Cabildo was published on 17 May 1973, eight days before the democratically elected president Héctor Cámpora took office after several years of military dictatorship. The founders were far-right intellectuals. During the initial stage the magazine consistently demanded the return to military rule through a new coup d'état. Not long afterwards, President Cámpora resigned, leaving the way open for Juan Perón to return to the country from exile and be elected president. After Perón's death, the government of his wife and vice-president Isabel Perón ordered Cabildo to be closed down on three occasions. And finally it was closed in 1975.

The magazine returned in August 1976 after the military coup that started the National Reorganization Process, and became almost regularly a monthly publication. The June 1977 issue, however, was retired from circulation by the government, and the July issue was cancelled, because Cabildo had covered the kidnapping of journalist Jacobo Timerman, which the dictatorship wanted to pass as a legal detention.

The magazine was notoriously anti-Semitic and supported the idea of a global Zionist conspiracy and blamed Jews in Argentina for the violence of left-wing guerrilla insurgents, employing common stereotypes of Jews and well-known conspiracy theories to accuse Jews of funding Marxist organizations.

Cabildo continued being published after the return to democratic rule in 1983. Among its frequent collaborators was General Ramón Camps, who lead the Buenos Aires Provincial Police and was responsible for committing multiple crimes (including 32 murders), for which he was eventually amnestied.

Since 1989, the critical economic situation of Argentina caused the magazine to be released irregularly. In 1991 it was discontinued, but it was restarted in 1998 with part of the original staff and some new collaborators.

Cabildo continues being published. Its editorial line focuses on current topics, such as the reproductive health policies of President Néstor Kirchner, and his sometimes tense relations with the Argentine Catholic Church. It supports ultra-conservative (pre-Vatican II) Catholic teachings, and criticizes the human rights stance of the government with regard to the crimes committed by the armed forces during the Dirty War. The magazine also advertises courses and seminaries with a fascist ideological orientation, usually held on Catholic Church facilities. A review of a 2005 issue in the leftist newspaper Página/12 claimed that Cabildo "works like the repressed unconscious that says what the Catholic right thinks."

References

1973 establishments in Argentina
Anti-communism in Argentina
Antisemitic publications
Anti-Zionism in South America
Argentine nationalism
Catholicism in Argentina
Catholic nationalism
Far-right politics in Argentina
Fascist newspapers and magazines
Irregularly published magazines
Magazines established in 1973
Monthly magazines published in Argentina
Political magazines published in Argentina
Spanish-language magazines
Traditionalist Catholic magazines